Michael Prior (15 March 1942 – 21 July 2004) was a priest of the Congregation of the Mission, professor of biblical theology at Saint Mary's College, University of Surrey, and a liberation theologian. He was one of the more colourful and controversial figures in the Catholic Church in Great Britain, and an outspoken critic of Israel and of Zionism.

Biography
Prior was born in Cork in 1942. He entered the Congregation of the Mission on leaving school and took a degree in Physics at University College Dublin. Trained at Vincentian Seminary in St Joseph's, Blackrock, on completing his theological studies he was ordained in Castleknock College in 1969. After ordination he studied Semitic Languages, gaining his Licentiate in Sacred Scripture in Rome in 1972. He then obtained a PhD on the theology of St Paul from King's College London.

For three years he was director of the Vincentian Formation, followed by two years at Bishop Ullathorne Roman Catholic School, Coventry. In 1977, he was appointed to St Mary's College, Twickenham, first as lecturer in theology, then as department head (1987–97), and subsequently as professor of Theology and Religious Studies.

Work
Prior was an anti-Zionist and believed that biblical scholarship encouraged collusion in the oppression of the Palestinian people.  In his book, The Bible and Colonialism: a moral critique, Prior argued that the biblical narrative of the Exodus from Egypt and the Conquest of Canaan had been deployed to justify what he considered colonialism in Palestine, the Americas, and South Africa.

In his book, Zionism and the State of Israel: a moral inquiry, Prior developed a moral critique of Zionism, emphasizing its secular roots and the relatively recent character of support for Zionism by religious Jewry. Prior also claimed that the expulsion of the Palestinians, far from being a consequence of the Nazi Holocaust or of the fortunes of war in 1948, had been planned by the founding fathers of Zionism from the beginning. Prior believed that Zionism was morally flawed from 1948, when the first war was fought.

Published works
Prior, Michael, Western scholarship and the History of Palestine, Melisende, 1998
Prior, Michael, The Bible and Colonialism: a moral critique,  Continuum International Publishing Group, 1997
Prior, Michael,  Zionism and the State of Israel: a moral inquiry,	Psychology Press, 1999
Prior, Michael, Aruri, Naseer (Editors), Speaking the Truth: Zionism, Israel, and occupation, Olive Branch Press, 2005.  A collection of essays by various  authors.
Ateek, Naim, and Prior, Michael, Holy land, hollow jubilee: God, justice, and the Palestinians, Melisende, 1999
Prior, Michael, A Living Stone, Selected Essays and Addresses, Holy Land Trust / Melisende  2006 (Edited with an Introduction by Duncan Macpherson)

References

External links
 Macpherson, Duncan, "Professor Michael Prior - Controversial priest and theologian who was an outspoken supporter of Palestinian rights" (Obituary),  in The Independent, 23 August 2004.  online
 Oestreicher, Paul, "Father Michael Prior - Liberation theologian passionately committed to the Palestinian cause", (Obituary), in The Guardian,  6 August 2004, online

20th-century Irish Roman Catholic theologians
1942 births
2004 deaths
Anti-Zionism in the United Kingdom
Clergy from Cork (city)
Alumni of University College Dublin
Vincentians
Irish Vincentians
20th-century Irish Roman Catholic priests